Conservation Ontario is the umbrella organization which represents all of the conservation authorities in Ontario.  Conservation Ontario is the network of Ontario’s 36 Conservation Authorities.
 
Conservation Authorities are local, watershed management agencies that deliver services and programs that protect and manage water and other natural resources in partnership with government, landowners and other organizations

The 1946 Conservation Authorities Act provides the means by which the province and municipalities of Ontario could join to form a conservation authority within a specific area - the watershed - to undertake programs of natural resource management.

Conservation authorities are mandated to ensure the conservation, restoration and responsible management of Ontario's water, land and natural habitats through programs that balance human, environmental and economic needs. There are currently 36 conservation authorities in Ontario. Most management programs occur in parks known as conservation areas.

Key areas of Authority activity include:

 Environmental protection — Conservation authorities protect local ecosystems and contribute to the quality of life in communities throughout the province. 
 Water Resource Management — Conservation authorities are Ontario's community-based environmental experts who use integrated, ecologically sound environmental practices to manage Ontario's water resources on a watershed basis, maintain secure supplies of clean water, protect communities from flooding and contribute to municipal planning processes (that protect water). The organization issues report cards detailing surface water quality, groundwater quality, and forest conditions.

Ontario Conservation Authorities
 Ausable Bayfield Conservation Authority
 Cataraqui Region Conservation Authority
 Catfish Creek Conservation Authority
 Central Lake Ontario Conservation Authority
 Conservation Halton
 Credit Valley Conservation
 Crowe Valley Conservation Authority
 Essex Region Conservation Authority
 Ganaraska Region Conservation Authority
 Grand River Conservation Authority
 Grey Sauble Conservation
 Hamilton Conservation Authority
 Kawartha Conservation
 Kettle Creek Conservation Authority
 Lake Simcoe Region Conservation Authority
 Lakehead Region Conservation Authority
 Long Point Region Conservation Authority
 Lower Thames Valley Conservation Authority
 Lower Trent Conservation
 Maitland Valley Conservation Authority
 Mattagami Region Conservation Authority
 Mississippi Valley Conservation
 Niagara Peninsula Conservation Authority
 Nickel District Conservation Authority
 North Bay-Mattawa Conservation Authority
 Nottawasaga Valley Conservation Authority
 Otonabee Conservation
 Quinte Conservation
 Raisin Region Conservation Authority
 Rideau Valley Conservation Authority
 Saugeen Conservation
 Sault Ste. Marie Region Conservation Authority
 South Nation Conservation
 St. Clair Region Conservation Authority
 Toronto and Region Conservation Authority
 Upper Thames River Conservation Authority

See also 
 Conservation authority
 Essex Region Conservation Authority
 St. Clair Parks Commission
 Niagara Parks Commission
 National Capital Commission
 St. Lawrence Parks Commission - St. Lawrence Parks Commission
 Great Lakes / St. Lawrence Seaway System
 Ottawa River Waterway - Lake Temiskaming / Ottawa River Waterway
 Rouge Park
 Ontario Parks
 Parks Canada
 Société des établissements de plein air du Québec (SEPAQ)
 List of Quebec national parks

External links 
 Official Conservation Ontario website
 Indexed map of all Conservation authorities in Ontario
 National Association of Conservation Districts (US) 

.
Environment of Ontario
Ontario government departments and agencies
Natural resources agencies in Canada
1980 in the environment
1980 establishments in Ontario
Environmental organizations established in 1980
Government agencies established in 1980